Åsa Lönnqvist is a Swedish retired football player who played in the defender position who played for the  Sweden women's national football team and Tyresö FF.

Career
She represented Sweden at the 1995 FIFA Women's World Cup, 1999 FIFA Women's World Cup as well as the  1996 Summer Olympics and 2000 Summer Olympics.

Other work
Following her playing career, Lönnqvist was named to the board of Tyresö FF. In March 2011, she was also elected to the Board of Appeals at the Swedish Football Association.

Lönnqvist has served on the boards of Tyresö FF and Swedish Football Association.

Honors and awards
 Swedish Championship: 1997, 1998, 1999
 Swedish Cup: 1997, 1999

References

External links
 

1970 births
Living people
Swedish women's footballers
Place of birth missing (living people)
Olympic footballers of Sweden
Footballers at the 1996 Summer Olympics
Tyresö FF players
Swedish Football Association
Sweden women's international footballers
1995 FIFA Women's World Cup players
Women's association football defenders
1999 FIFA Women's World Cup players